Ramón Flecha is a Spanish sociologist who is a professor of sociology at the University of Barcelona, Doctor Honoris Causa from West University of Timişoara, and a researcher in social sciences in Europe. Alain Touraine highlighted the contribution of Flecha in recognizing the knowledge of cultural analysis of people without studies:

Ulrich Beck pointed out how Flecha's analysis of contemporary sociological theory demonstrated rigorous research with facts, linking theory with criticism and empirical research with praxis:

He attributes a strong coherence between his personal and social life and the values that he promotes in his research. His sociological contributions cover different areas; research methodology (communicative methodology), culture (dialogic literary gatherings), economics (successful cooperative actions), education (learning communities), cultural groups (distinction of modern and postmodern racism), new masculinities (alternative masculinities), sociology of science (scientific, political and social impact) and social theory (dialogic societies).

Biography
Ramón Flecha was born in 1952. In 1967, he collaborated in the creation of a cultural centre of activities in the most deprived area of his city of birth, Bilbao. He was a member of the clandestine opposition against Franco's dictatorship from 1969 until democracy arrived in Spain. During the years of dictatorship as a democratic leader, he opposed any dictatorship as well as sexual harassment within organizations. The application of the values of democracy, equality and freedom were consistent in their personal and social life. In 1978 he moved to a neighbourhood of Barcelona where there were shacks and founded La Verneda Adult School – Sant Martí, being the first Spanish experience published in the specialized journal "Harvard Educational Review", and identified as one of the exemplary adult education experiences. He worked with Paulo Freire for more than twenty years, and the cultural creation of dialogic literary gatherings is known as one of the relevant pedagogical creations within the field of international critical pedagogy.

In 1991 Flecha founded the CREA research centre at the University of Barcelona. Currently, the centre has become a network of researchers from different universities. The communicative methodology created in the research centre has served as a reference in different fields of research, but with particular relevance in research focused on vulnerable groups. In 1997 he published his first book that included the theory of dialogic learning, subsequently published in English and in Chinese.

The theoretical basis is the basis of the transformation of schools into Learning Communities – School as learning communities. In parallel, to the development of research, as a professor at the University of Barcelona, he began to identify how the problem of sexual harassment in Spanish universities was severe. In 1995, he presented the first complaint to the university's governing team that addressed the issue by creating international organizations and procedures that were being carried out in other universities around the world. No measures were implemented until the Law for the effective equality of women and men 2007, which included the obligation of Spanish universities to have equality commissions and protocols against gender violence. He supported as director of the centre the women's group CREA-SAFO. This group is responsible for leading gender studies and the prevention of gender violence. He supported them when they decided to continue denouncing sexual harassment perpetrated in the university, as well as when they decided to lead the first investigation R&D on Gender Violence in Spanish Universities. Thanks to his support and research, his work to overcome gender violence was reflected in the first publication of scientific results on sexual harassment in Spanish universities in the international scientific journal Violence Against Women, the most important one on the issue. Due to his stand in favor of the victims, he himself has received attacks and defamation of his person, which is known as second-order sexual harassment, a concept about which he has recently published another research article in Violence Against Women, as the press has echoed. From the beginning of his career until now he has directed numerous national and European research. Regarding the political and social impact, two of them should be highlighted.

The first, WORKALÓ research of the FP5 European Framework Program, was the first European research about the Roma in Europe, and the first, where researchers and members of the Roma community collaborated as a joint team. The main conclusion of the study was the need for recognition of the Roma people on the part of the institutions, and this contribution was introduced in a parliamentary session being approved unanimously by the European Parliament. As of that moment, several member states included in their parliaments the same recognition, as was the case of the Spanish parliament. The second, INCLUD-ED of the sixth European Framework Program, was selected as the only outstanding research in social and human sciences by the European Commission in its publication of the list of the ten successful scientific investigations. Concerning its political impact, the communication from the European Commission to the European Parliament stands out. This communication included the recommendation to promote learning communities in Europe – schools as learning communities- to overcome school dropout and improve academic results, one of the conclusions of the study. There are currently 685 learning communities-school as learning communities-, mainly in Europe and Latin America.

He is currently advising the evaluation of the social impact of science in the European Framework Program, after the completion of his latest European research IMPACT-EV.

Distinctions and awards 
His contributions have been awarded by various institutions, some examples;

 2007 Doctor Honoris Causa by the West University of Timișoara
 2012 Gold Medal for Merit in Education of the Junta de Andalucía
 2016 Research Award for his contribution to schooling and academic success of roma students – Instituto Cultura Gitana
 2019 Catalonia Award of Sociology 2019 – Associació Catalana de Sociologia
 2019 Muncunill Social Innovation Award – Ajuntament de Terrassa

Publications
Some of his publications are;
 Flecha, R. (2021). ‘Second-Order Sexual Harassment: Violence Against the Silence Breakers Who Support the Victims’, Violence Against Women, pp. 1–20.
Puigvert, L., Gelsthorpe, L., Soler-Gallart, M., & Flecha, R. (2019). Girls’ perceptions of boys with violent attitudes and behaviours, and of sexual attraction. Palgrave Communications, 5(1), 1–12. https://doi.org/10.1057/s41599-019-0262-5
Flecha, R., Soler, M. & Sordé, T. (2015).Social impact: Europe must fund social sciences, Nature, 528, 193. doi:10.1038/528193d
 Flecha, R. (2015). Successful Educational Actions for Inclusion and Social Cohesion in Europe. New York: Springer.
 Flecha, R. (2014). Using mixed methods from a communicative orientation: Researching with grassroots Roma. Journal of Mixed Methods Research, 8 (3):245-254. doi:10.1177/1558689814527945
 Flecha, R. & Soler, M. (2014).Communicative Methodology:  Successful Actions and Dialogic Politics. Current Sociology, 62(2): 232–242. doi:10.1177/0011392113515141
 Flecha, R., & Soler, M. (2013). Turning difficulties into possibilities: engaging Roma families and students in school through dialogic learning. Cambridge Journal of Education. doi: 10.1080/0305764X.2013.819068. This paper obtained the 2013 Best Paper Prize of Cambridge Journal of Education.
Touraine, A.; Wieviorka, M.; Flecha, R. et al. (2004). Conocimiento e identidad. Voces de grupos culturales en la investigación social. Barcelona: Roure
Flecha, R. (2000): Sharing Words. Theory and Practice of Dialogic Learning. Lanham, M.D: Rowman & Littlefield, also available in Spanish and Chinese.
Castells, M.; Flecha, R.; Freire, P.; Giroux, H.; Macedo, D. & Willis, P. (1999): Critical Education in the New Information Age. Lanham, M.D: Rowman & Littlefield. Foreword by Peter Mclaren. Also available in Spanish and Portuguese.
Flecha, R. (1999). Modern and postmodern racism in Europe: dialogic approach and anti-racist pedagogies, Harvard Educational Review, 69(2), 150–171.

References

External links
ORCID – Ramón Flecha
The Paulo and Nita Freire International Project for Critical Pedagogy, retrieved September 3, 2019.

Spanish sociologists
1952 births
Living people
Academic staff of the University of Barcelona